Green-Legged Partridge may refer to:

 the Green-legged Partridge, a chicken breed from Poland
 the green-legged partridge, Arborophila chloropus, a species of partridge from Southeast Asia